Otto Monsen (August 19, 1887 – December 14, 1979) was a Norwegian track and field athlete who competed in the 1908 Summer Olympics and in the 1912 Summer Olympics.

In 1908 he participated in the high jump competition but failed to clear a height. Four years later he participated in the high jump competition again. He cleared 1.75 metre but did not qualify for the final. He finished tied for 13th.

References

External links 
 

1887 births
1979 deaths
Norwegian male high jumpers
Athletes (track and field) at the 1908 Summer Olympics
Athletes (track and field) at the 1912 Summer Olympics
Olympic athletes of Norway
Norwegian male speed skaters
Olympic male high jumpers